Perpetual LOYAL is a maxi yacht. She won the 2016 Sydney to Hobart Yacht Race skippered by Tom Slingsby and is owned by Anthony Bell.

Career
Perpetual LOYAL won line honours in the 2016 Sydney to Hobart Yacht Race, in a record time of 1 day, 13 hours, 31 minutes and 20 seconds. Perpetual LOYAL broke the previous race record by 5 hours, averaging a speed of 17 knots.

Sponsorship
Perpetual sponsorship of the LOYAL expired before the 2016 Sydney to Hobart Yacht Race. Bell was unable to secure new sponsorship or branding before the race and raced with the old branding in place.

References

2010s sailing yachts
Sailboat type designs by Juan Kouyoumdjian
Sydney to Hobart Yacht Race yachts
Sailing yachts of Australia